Oprea is a Romanian surname. Individuals with this name include:

Bogdan Oprea (born 1982), Romanian footballer
Dănuț Oprea (born 1972), Romanian football player
Gabriel Oprea (born 1961), Romanian politician
Igor Oprea (born 1969), Moldovan football player
Leonard Oprea (born 1953), Romanian author
Marian Oprea (born 6 June), Romanian Olympic athlete in triple jump
Marius Oprea (born 1964), Romanian historian and author
Mircea Oprea (born 1980), Romanian football player
Niculina Oprea (born 1957), Romanian poet
Olivia Oprea or "Oli" (born 1987), Romanian footballer
Vasile Oprea (born 1957), Romanian Olympic handball player
Oprea Păunescu (born 1936), Romanian Olympic rower

Romanian-language surnames